''See Paleopolis for namesakes
Palaeopolis (or Palæopolis) in Pamphylia was an Ancient city and bishopric in Asia Minor (now Anatolia, Asian Turkey), and is a Catholic episcopal titular see.

History 
Palæopolis, at the site of modern Akören (the one in Adana Province's Aladağ district?), was important enough in the Roman province of Pamphylia Secunda to become a suffragan bishopric of the capital Perge's Metropolitan Archbishop.

Titular see 
The diocese was nominally restored in 1933 as a titular bishopric of the lowest (episcopal) rank.

It is vacant, having had a single, Eastern Catholic incumbent: 
 Titular Bishop Ioan Dragomir (1949 – 1985.04.25), as Auxiliary Bishop of Maramureş of the Romanians (Romania) (1949 – 1964), later succeeding as Apostolic Administrator of the same Maramureş of the Romanians (Romanian language Byzantine Rite) (1964 – 1985.04.25)

See also 
 Palaeopolis in Asia

References

External links 
 GigaCatholic, with titular incumbent biography link

Catholic titular sees in Asia
Populated places in ancient Pamphylia
Former populated places in Turkey
Roman towns and cities in Turkey